Ernst Runar Schildt (October 26, 1888, Helsinki – September 29, 1925) was a Swedish-speaking Finnish author from Helsinki. His son was art historian and author Göran Schildt. Although Schildt wrote his books in Swedish, they have also been translated into Finnish, English, French and German.

Runar Schildt debuted as a writer in 1912 with his first book, a collection of short stories called Den segrande Eros (The Victorious Eros). All in all, he wrote 33 short stories, of which 25 were published as books. His short stories have also been adapted for films, including Aapo, Galgmannen, The Stolen Death, and The Kiss of a Sparrow (directed by Claes Olsson).

A selection of Schildt's works
Armas Fager 
Asmodeus och de tretton själarna samt tre noveller
Den segrande Eros
Den stora rollen
En sparv i tranedans (which was made into the movie The Kiss of a Sparrow)

Galgmannen: en midvintersaga 
Häxskogen och andra noveller 
Hemkomsten och andra noveller 
Lyckoriddaren
Perdita och andra noveller

Further reading

References

External links
 

1888 births
1925 suicides
Writers from Helsinki
Finnish writers in Swedish